Puneett Chouksey (born 4 December) is an Indian actor and model.

Early life
Puneett Chouksey was born on 4 December 1990 in Shivpuri, Madhya Pradesh to Ushakiran Choukse. He has an elder brother, Sanket Chouksey who is also a TV actor. His sister, Mohini Shri Gaur is a playback singer.

Chouksey completed his MBA from Prestige Institute of Management and Research (PIMR), Indore.

Career 
Chouksey first started his career as a Customer Service Manager in IndusInd Bank. Then he joined 
Anupam Kher's Actor Prepares - The School for Actors to pursue his career in acting. 

Chouksey made his acting debut in 2016, with Sadda Haq. He rose to fame, by playing, Aditya "Adi" Sehgal in Hindi television series Naagin 3. In 2019, Chouksey made his debut in web-series with Ishq Aaj Kal. In 2020, Chouksey got his first lead role as Arjun Venkatraman in Colors TV series Naati Pinky Ki Lambi Love Story opposite Riya Shukla. Chouksey was last seen playing the parallel lead role of Dr. Akshay Kaul in Colors TV series Shakti - Astitva Ke Ehsaas Ki opposite Jigyasa Singh. Since November 2021, he appears in Colors TV's show Sirf Tum.

Filmography

Television

Web series and films

See also 

 List of Indian actors
 List of Indian television actors

References

External links 

 

Living people
Indian television actors
Indian male soap opera actors
21st-century Indian male actors
Indian male models
Indian male television actors
Male actors in Hindi television
People from Madhya Pradesh
Actors from Madhya Pradesh
1991 births